Moina Mathers, born Mina Bergson (28 February 1865 – 25 July 1928), was an artist and occultist at the turn of the 20th century. She was the sister of French philosopher Henri Bergson, the first man of Jewish descent to be awarded the Nobel Prize for Literature in 1927. She is, however, more known for her marriage to the English occultist, Samuel Liddell MacGregor Mathers, one of the founders of the organisation Hermetic Order of the Golden Dawn and, after his death in 1918, for being the head of a successor organisation, called the Rosicrucian Order of the Alpha et Omega.

Biography
Moina, then named Mina, or Minna, was born in Geneva, Switzerland, to an influential Polish-Jewish family from father's and English and Irish from mother's sides, moving to Paris, when she was but two years of age. Her father, Michel Bergson, achieved some musical success in composing the operas Louisa de Montfort and Salvator Rosa,  he was a native of Warsaw and member of the influential Bereksohn family. Moina Mathers' grandfather, Jacob Levison (born c. 1799) was a surgeon and a dentist. Her grandmother was Katherine Levison, born in London in c. 1800. Her maternal aunt was Minna Preuss, born in Hull, Yorkshire, in 1835, and her mother, Kate, née Levison, was also born in Yorkshire. Her eldest brother, was later Nobel Prize winner Henri Bergson, 1859–1941, joined the faculty of the College of France and is best known for authoring the philosophical work Creative Evolution. He was also the president of the British Society for Psychical Research.

Moina was a talented artist and joined the Slade School of Art, at the age of fifteen. The Slade was known for encouraging young women in the Arts, at the turn of the nineteenth century. Moina was awarded a scholarship and four merit certificates for drawing at the School. She became friends with Beatrice Offor, with whom she shared a studio. It was also at the Slade in 1882, that Moina met her future friend Annie Horniman, who would become the major financial sponsor for the Matherses, as struggling artists and occultists, in backing the Hermetic Order of the Golden Dawn.

Moina met her husband, Samuel Liddell MacGregor Mathers, in 1887, while studying at the British Museum, where Samuel was a frequent patron. A year later, her future husband founded the Hermetic Order of the Golden Dawn, one of the most influential organisations in the Western Mystery Tradition. Moina was the first initiate of this Order in March, 1888. Her chosen motto in the Golden Dawn was Vestigia Nulla Retrorsum, meaning "Prudence never retraces its steps." A year later in 1890, she married S. L. Mathers and Mina Bergson became Moina Mathers. In their occult partnership, her husband was described as the "evoker of spirits" and Moina as the clairvoyant "seeress", who often illustrated, as an artist, what her husband "evoked". In March 1899, they performed the rites of the Egyptian goddess Isis, on the stage of the Théâtre La Bodinière in Paris.

In 1918, when her husband died, Moina took over the Alpha et Omega, a successor organisation to the Golden Dawn, as its Imperatrix. She died in 1928 in London.

See also
 The Book of Abramelin
 Magic
 Occultism
 List of Occultists

Notes

References
 Greer, Mary K. (1995) ‘’Women of the Golden Dawn: Rebels and Priestesses." Rochester, Vermont: One Park Street. 

1865 births
1928 deaths
Bereksohn family
Hermetic Order of the Golden Dawn
French Ashkenazi Jews
French people of Polish-Jewish descent
19th-century occultists
French occultists
French emigrants to the United Kingdom